The Ven Hugh Trevor Wheeler was Archdeacon of Lahore from 1919 to 1929

Wheeler was educated at Trinity College, Dublin and ordained Deacon in 1897 and Priest in 1898.  He was  Curate at Tullylish and then went out to the North Western Frontier Province. He was at Sialkot, Multan, Murree, Rawalpindi, Ambala, Shimla and Karachi before his time as Archdeacon and at Broughton Astley afterwards.

Notes

Alumni of Trinity College Dublin
Christianity in Lahore
Archdeacons of Lahore
Year of birth missing
Year of death missing